Metak (English: Bullet) is the seventh studio album by Bosnian Serb singer Stoja. It was released in 2006.

Track listing
Ne slušaj vesti (Don't Listen to the News)
Nešto mi govori (Something Tells Me)
Gde god pođem tebi idem (Wherever I Go, I'm Going to You) featuring Šako Polumenta
Neću proći jeftino (I Won't Pass Easily)
Metak (Bullet)
Sve sam živo pokvarila (I've Ruined Everything)
Leti leti (Fly Fly)
Ako smeta tvojoj sreći (If It Bothers Your Happiness)

References

2006 albums
Stoja albums
Grand Production albums